Galguni (also Romanized as Galgūnī; also known as Deh Gerdū and Galgūn) is a village in Mashayekh Rural District, Doshman Ziari District, Mamasani County, Fars Province, Iran. At the 2006 census, its population was 151, in 36 families.

References 

Populated places in Mamasani County